The 1990 World Ringette Championship (1990 WRC) was an international ringette tournament and the first World Ringette Championship in history. Three countries took part: Canada, Finland, and the United States. The tournament was organized by the World Ringette Council, the precursor to the International Ringette Federation (IRF). The event was held in the Canadian city of Gloucester, Ontario from January 29 to February 3, 1990, with eight competing teams.

Overview

Three countries participated: Canada, Finland and United States. A total of 8 teams entered the competition. The teams from Canada included Team Alberta, Team Saskatchewan, Team Manitoba, Team Ontario, Team Quebec, and Team Gloucester (the team from the 1990 WRC's host city).

Finland finished seventh and the United States eighth while Canadian teams monopolized the podium. Team Alberta, which consisted of ringette players from the province's "Calgary Debs", won the first world ringette title in international competition and the WRC's new Sam Jacks Trophy after defeating Team Ontario, 6 – 5 in the final.

Venue
The event was held in the Canadian city of Gloucester, Ontario.

Teams

Final standings

Rosters

Team Finland
The 1990 Team Finland team included players Arja Oksanen and Virpi Karjalainen.

Team Canada
Canada sent six different regional teams to the first World Ringette Championships in 1990: Team Alberta (Calgary Debs), Team Ontario, Team Quebec, Team Manitoba, Team Saskatchewan, and Team Gloucester (host).

The winners of the 1989 Western Canadian Ringette Championships advanced to the first World Ringette Championships in 1990 as Team Alberta. The Alberta-based ringette team went on to become the first team to ever win the World Ringette Championship and the Sam Jacks Trophy. Clémence Duchesneau was named the tournament's top goalie.

Team Alberta
In 1990, Canada's Team Alberta consisted of players from the Calgary Debs. The team went on to become the first team to ever win the World Ringette Championship and the Sam Jacks Trophy.

The 1990 Team Alberta team (Calgary Debs) included the following:

See also
 World Ringette Championships
 International Ringette Federation
  Canada national ringette team
  Finland national ringette team
  Sweden national ringette team
  United States national ringette team

References

World Ringette Championships
Ringette
Ringette competitions